A50, the section of Rijksweg 50 that is constructed as controlled-access highway, is a north–south motorway in the Netherlands, running from Eindhoven in the province of North Brabant, northwards passing by the cities of Oss, Nijmegen, Arnhem and Apeldoorn, to its northern terminus in the province of Gelderland near the city of Zwolle.

The highway is maintained by Rijkswaterstaat.

Route description
It passes the cities of Eindhoven, Oss, Nijmegen, Arnhem, Apeldoorn and Zwolle.

History
During the Second World War the Highway was known as Highway 69. Since 1969, it is known as N69 and has that name now only between the border of North Brabant and European route E34. 

The highway was an important and only avenue of advance during Operation Market Garden, and after the fighting along its length between Allied and Wehrmacht forces it was named "Hell's Highway" so named because of the effective artillery fire directed at it by the German forces in the area. The wrecks on the soft shoulders of the highway prevented its use by other vehicles, in effect converting the highway into a narrow corridor, and slowing the movement on it to a crawl for the Allied drivers.

Exit list

See also
List of motorways in the Netherlands
List of E-roads in the Netherlands

References

Footnotes

Works cited
 Koskimaki, George E., Hell's highway: chronicle of the 101st Airborne Division in the Holland Campaign, September - November 1944, Casemate, Havertown, 2003
 Ambrose, Stephen E., Citizen Soldiers: The U. S. Army from the Normandy Beaches to the Bulge to the Surrender of Germany, Part One, Chapter 4, Touchstone, New York, 1997

External links

Motorways in the Netherlands
Motorways in Gelderland
Motorways in North Brabant
Transport in Eindhoven
Transport in Oss